Colour Vision is the third studio album by American singer MAX, released on September 18, 2020, through Colour Vision Records and Sony Entertainment. A primarily pop record, the album is the singer's first in four years since Hell's Kitchen Angel, and was conceived following a 2018 surgery to remove polyps from his vocal cords. During recovery, he was unable to sing for a period of four months and developed a renewed outlook towards music in that time, which resulted in a more personal approach to his writing than before. Thematically, the album deals with love and relationships, and was heavily inspired by the singer's marriage with his wife Emily.

Track listing

Charts

References 

2020 albums